Baron of Retiro is a Brazilian noble title created by Pedro II of Brazil, by decree of August 11, 1889, in favor of Geraldo Augusto de Resende.

References 

Pedro II of Brazil
Brazilian noble titles
Juiz de Fora